Senator Garrison may refer to:

Earl Garrison (born 1941), Oklahoma State Senate
George Tankard Garrison (1835–1889), Virginia State Senate
T. Ed Garrison Jr. (1922–2013), South Carolina State Senate